is a  railway station in Kita, Tokyo, Japan, operated by East Japan Railway Company (JR East).

Lines

Station layout

The station has two island platforms serving three tracks (platforms 2 and 3 are located on either side of the same track).

Platforms

History
The stations opened on 1 August 1931, initially named Shimo-Jūjō Station. On 1 April 1957, the station was renamed Higashi-Jūjō.

Surrounding area
 Jūjō Station (Saikyō Line)
 Fuji Shrine

References

External links

 East station information page 

Railway stations in Japan opened in 1931
Keihin-Tōhoku Line
Railway stations in Tokyo